Quillajaceae is a family of flowering plants.  It contains only two extant species, Quillaja brasiliensis and Quillaja saponaria, and one fossil species, Dakotanthus cordiformis.

References

 
Rosid families